Mjølnir is a meteorite crater on the floor of Barents Sea off the coast of Norway.

Etymology 
Mjølnir is the name of Thor's mythological hammer. Giving the crater this name was presumably an allusion to the power of the weapon, which is often described as breaking and smashing rocks.

Description 
In 2006, a group of Swedish geologists discovered indications of a tsunami flooding the Swedish southern coast at about 145 million years ago. It is speculated to be associated with the Mjølnir impact, together with similar indications discovered in 2000 in France.

References

External links 
 Mjølnir at Earth Impact Database
 Mjølnir impact crater homepage - archived from the original on August 18, 2017.

Impact craters of Norway
Impact craters of the Arctic
Cretaceous impact craters
Cretaceous Norway
Berriasian Stage
Barents Sea